The 1904 Paris–Roubaix was the ninth edition of the Paris–Roubaix, a classic one-day cycle race in France. The single day event was held on 3 April 1904 and stretched  from Paris to its end in a velodrome in Roubaix. The winner was Hippolyte Aucouturier from France.

Results

References

Paris–Roubaix
Paris–Roubaix
Paris–Roubaix
Paris–Roubaix